The Commissioner's Award is presented annually by the Commissioner of the Canadian Football League to an individual or individuals who have demonstrated dedication and made a significant contribution to Canadian Football.  The award was first introduced in the 1990 CFL season.

Award winners
2022 - Jeff Harbin, CFL official for 22 years.
2021 - Nurse Sara May, Hamilton-area nurse in honour of her work during Covid-19 pandemic.
2019 - Jim Lawson, chairman of the CFL’s Board of Governors
2018 - Pierre Vercheval
2017 - Rick Sowieta, former Ottawa Rough Rider
2016 - Jason Colero - Toronto Argonauts Director of Education & Community Programs
2015 - Bernie Custis, CFL's first Black Quarterback
2014 - Ottawa Redblack Ownership Group
2013 - Dwayne Mandrusiak, Edmonton Eskimos Equipment Manager
2012 - Every Player in the CFL
2011 - Larry Reda, BC Amateur Football
2010 - Ridernation, All the fans of Saskatchewan Roughriders
2009 - Wally Buono, Calgary Stampeders and BC Lions GM and Coach
2008 - Ron Lancaster, Outstanding career with several CFL teams as player, Coach, CBC broadcaster
2007 - Keith Pelley, Toronto Argonauts
2006 - Winnipeg Blue Bombers Ghosts
2005 - Water Boys, Vancouver 
2004 - Russ Jackson, Ottawa Rough Riders Hall of Fame Quarterback
2003 - TSN, Toronto
2002 - Hugh Campbell, Long time Edmonton Eskimos Coach/GM/CEO & President
2001 - Robert Wetenhall and Larry Smith, Montreal Alouettes owners
2000 - Jeff Gilles, Toronto Argonauts
1999 - Fausto Bellomino, Toronto
1998 - Jim Hunt, Toronto writer, radio broadcaster
1997 - Bolan and Egres
1996 - John Tory, Toronto Argonauts
1995 - Don Wittman, CBC Broadcaster
1994 - Norm Fieldgate, British Columbia Lions
1993 - Reg Wheeler, Hamilton Wildcats, helped build Canadian Football Hall of Fame
1992 - Tom Shepherd, Saskatchewan Roughriders
1991 - Jack Matheson, Winnipeg Tribune sports writer
1990 - Greg B. Fulton, played for Calgary, he developed play-by-play summaries and record stats for the CFL, & member of CFL rules committee.

References

Canadian Football League trophies and awards